Scholtzia parviflora is a shrub species in the family Myrtaceae that is endemic to Western Australia.

The plant has a spreading habit with decumbent branches. It blooms between August and October producing pink-white flowers. The plant superficially resembles Scholtzia uberiflora but is much more widespread.

The species was first formally described by the botanist Ferdinand von Mueller in 1864 as part of the work Fragmenta Phytographiae Australiae. The only known synonym is Baeckea parviflora.

It is found in wet depressions in the Mid West and Wheatbelt regions of Western Australia between Geraldton and Cunderdin where it grows in sandy soils over laterite. It is part of the understorey in kwongan shrubland communities.

References

parviflora
Plants described in 1864
Taxa named by Ferdinand von Mueller